Arthur Henry Hooper (5 December 1888 – 22 December 1963) was an English professional footballer who played as a forward in the Football League for Manchester United.

Personal life
In December 1915, over a year after the outbreak of the First World War, Hooper enlisted in the British Army under the Derby Scheme. He was mobilised on 1 July 1916 and joined the Worcestershire Regiment. Prior to that point, he had worked in munitions. Hooper served as a corporal during the final 14 months of the First World War and saw action at the Polygon Wood, Broodseinde, Poelcappelle and on the Italian Front. He suffered a gunshot wound to the head on 30 July 1918 and after recovering, he was attached to the Labour Corps and made acting company sergeant major of the 517th Prisoner of War Company. Hooper returned to Britain and was transferred to the reserve list in September 1919.

Career statistics

References

External links
Profile at StretfordEnd.co.uk
Profile at MUFCInfo.com

English footballers
Kidderminster Harriers F.C. players
Crystal Palace F.C. players
Manchester United F.C. players
People from Brierley Hill
1888 births
1963 deaths
Association football inside forwards
English Football League players
Southern Football League players
Worcestershire Regiment soldiers
Royal Pioneer Corps soldiers
British Army personnel of World War I
British shooting survivors
Military personnel from Staffordshire